Randi Nilie Nordby Johnson (May 15, 1926 – March 28, 1991) was a Norwegian actress. She was engaged with the Oslo New Theater for many years. As an actress, she used her maiden name as her stage name.

Career
Randi Nordby started her career very early, and already as a child she was acting in Inga Bjørnson's children's theater. She made her stage debut at age 12 in 1938 in The Women (Norwegian title: Kvinner) by Clare Boothe Luce at the New Theater in Oslo. She made her adult debut in 1945 in Leonid Leonov's play Invasion at the Studio Theater, and she remained there until it had to close in 1950. She was then at the New Theater until 1963. She later performed as a freelance actress. At the New Theater she appeared in plays such as William Shakespeare's Hamlet, Ralph Benatzky and Robert Stolz's The White Horse Inn (Norwegian title: Sommer i Tyrol), and Eugène Ionesco's The Chairs. Later she performed on NRK's Radio Theater and Television Theater.

Nordby made her film debut in Trost i taklampa in 1954. On radio, she became known in the role of Effie in the popular radio play Dickie Dick Dickens.

Family
Nordby was the daughter of the operator Otto A. Nordby (1899–1978) and Kirsten Nordby (née Aas, 1901–1968). She was first married to the Danish theater personality and writer Kaare Trolle Bing (1921–2016), and then to the Swedish film producer Eric Johnson (died 1991). She was the mother of the cultural historian Morten Bing.

Theater roles

 1938: Little Mary in The Women (Norwegian title: Kvinner) by Clare Boothe Luce at the New Theater
 1940: Scrap in Dear Octopus (Norwegian title: Guldbryllupet) by Dodie Smith at the New Theater
 1944: Åse in Det spøker på Klosterodden by Nils-Reinhardt Christensen at the New Theater
 1944: The young girl in Blink går over alle grenser by Lars Levi Laestadius at the New Theater
 1944: Evelyn in Jeg kjenner deg ikke by Aldo De Benedetti at the New Theater
 1945: Nisse in Da kongen kom tilbak at the Studio Theater
 1945: A Russian patriot in Invasjon by Leonid Leonov at the Studio Theater
 1946: Agnes in The Beautiful People  (Norwegian title: Vakre mennesker) by William Saroyan at the Studio Theater
 1946: The daughter  in The Skin of Our Teeth (Norwegian title: Familien Antrobus) by Thornton Wilder at the Studio Theater
 1947: Luciana in The Comedy of Errors (Norwegian title: Tvillingene) by William Shakespeare at the Studio Theater
 1947: A whore in The Threepenny Opera (Norwegian title: Tolvskillingsoperaen) by Bertolt Brecht at the Studio Theater
 1948: Berthe in Hets by Ingmar Bergman at the Studio Theater
 1948: Juliette in Le Voyageur sans bagage (Norwegian title: Reisende uten bagasje) by Jean Anouilh at the Studio Theater
 1948: Lise in Lise i Eventyrland, an adaption of Alice's Adventures in Wonderland by Lewis Carroll at the Studio Theater
 1949: Title role as Lille rislende kilde at the Studio Theater
 1950: Mrs. Tambov in Peter den lykkelige by Georges Neveux at the Studio Theater
 1950: Rebecca Gibbs in Our Town (Norwegian title: Byen vår) by Thornton Wilder at the Studio Theater
 1951: Pernette in Les Jours heureux (Norwegian title: De lykkelige dagene) by Claude-André Puget at the New Theater
 1951: Yvette in Bobosse (Norwegian title: Bu bu) by André Roussin at the New Theater
 1952: Ann Welch in The Deep Blue Sea (Norwegian title: Den dype blå sjøen) by Terence Rattigan at the New Theater
 1952: Marian Almond in The Heiress (Norwegian title: Arvingen) by Ruth and Augustus Goetz at the New Theater
 1953: Linda in Pal Joey at the New Theater
 1953: Ophelia in Hamlet by William Shakespeare at the New Theater
 1953: Willie in This Property Is Condemned (Norwegian title: Forbudt område) by Tennessee Williams at the New Theater
 1954: Klara in The White Horse Inn (Norwegian title: Sommer i Tyrol) by Ralph Benatzky and Robert Stolz at the New Theater (also on tour in 1956)
 1954: Netta the maid in Siste akt by Peter Egge at the New Theater
 1955: Brit in På fastende hjerte by Alex Brinchmann at the New Theater
 1955: Gerd in Babels tårn by Lars Helgesson at the New Theater
 1955: The princess in Trollskipet at the New Theater
 1956: Lucile in Le Fleuve de feu (Norwegian title: Landet uten vei) by François Mauriac at the New Theater
 1956: A young girl in Den spanske flue at the New Theater
 1957: The woman in The Chairs (Norwegian title: Stolene) by Eugène Ionesco at the New Theater
 1957: Malla in Miss Hook of Holland (Norwegian title: Jomfru Hook) by Austen Hurgon and Paul Rubens at the New Theater (tour)
 1958: The young girl in Dommeren by Moberg at the New Theater
 1958: Princess Louisa in The Sleeping Prince (play) (Norwegian title: Den sovende prinsen) by Terence Rattigan at the New Theater
 1959: Sister Guduoe in Mam'zelle Nitouche (Norwegian title: Nitouche) by Albert Millaud and Henri Meilhac at the New Theater
 1960: Barbara in The Wrong Side of the Park (Norwegian title: På den andre siden) by John Mortimer at the New Theater
 1960: Cloris in Lock Up Your Daughters (musical) (Norwegian title: Pass på døtrene) by Bernard Miles, Lionel Bart, and Laurie Johnson at the New Theater
 1961: Klara in Sommer i Tyrol by Benatzky at the summer theater in Frogner Park
 1962: Bernadette in Oscar by Claude Magnier at the New Theater
 1962: Mirka in Kattene by Walentin Chorell at the New Theater
 1963: Miss Hall in Kamraterna (Norwegian title: Kameratene) by August Strindberg at the Oslo New Theater

Filmography

 1955: Trost i taklampa as Ingebjørg
 1958: Bustenskjold as Signe, the widow's daughter
 1959: Støv på hjernen
 1961: Sønner av Norge as Mrs. Jørgensen
 1963: Freske fraspark
 1966: Hurra for Andersens
 1969: Psychedelica Blues as Mrs. Korsmo
 1975: Faneflukt as the mother
 1975: Skraphandlerne as Aunt Mette
 1976: Kjære Maren as a lady

Television

1970: Selma Brøter (Television Theater) as another office lady
1974: Fleksnes in the episode "Beklager, teknisk feil" as the lady next door
1976: Fleksnes in the episode "Radioten" as the angry lady next door
1981: Fleksnes in the episode "Dobbeltgjengeren" as the witness
1981: Helmer & Sigurdson in the episode "Spøkelsesbussen" as a bus passenger
1981: Når eplene modnes (Television Theater) as a lady at the boarding house
1988: Fleksnes in the episode "Radioten '88" as the angry lady next door

References

External links
 
 Randi Nordby at Sceneweb
 Randi Nordby at Filmfront
 Randi Nordby at the Swedish Film Database

1926 births
1991 deaths
20th-century Norwegian actresses
Actresses from Oslo